The  or  or  ("superintendent of the fleet") was a senior official and admiral of the Venetian navy. After the establishment of a sailing fleet next to the traditional galley fleet in the late 17th century, he was the most senior squadron admiral of the latter.

Until the Battle of Lepanto in 1571, the office was occupied by two holders, but thereafter this was usually disregarded as it was considered sufficient to appoint a single holder. Like all , he hoisted his ensign on a bastard galley, with striped red-and-white sails and tents. As his distinctive signs, the flagship of the  carried a single lantern and the standard of Saint Mark on a three-foot long staff topped by a "simple" gilded orb aft, a pennant in front, and square ensign of Saint Mark on the mainmast.

References

Sources
 
 

Military ranks of the Venetian navy
Republic of Venice admirals